Seona Cunningham Black (born 23 November 1954) is a former Scottish international lawn bowler.

Bowls career
Black has represented Scotland at the Commonwealth Games, in the triples event at the 2006 Commonwealth Games.

In 2005 she won a fours silver medal at the Atlantic Bowls Championships.

References

External links
 
 

1954 births
Living people
Scottish female bowls players
Bowls players at the 2006 Commonwealth Games